Bolshoye Boldino is a rural locality (a selo) and the administrative center of Bolsheboldinsky District, Nizhny Novgorod Oblast, Russia. Population:

References

Notes

Sources

Rural localities in Nizhny Novgorod Oblast
Bolsheboldinsky District
Lukoyanovsky Uyezd